Statistics of American Soccer League in season 1931.

Overview
At the start of this season the American Soccer League was in decline, suffering from the effects of the Great Depression. Clubs had begun to fold, merge and disappear. The eventual champions, New Bedford Whalers, had been formed by Sam Mark following the merger of Fall River F.C. and New York Yankees.   Long time ASL members Brooklyn Wanderers folded before the season. However New York Americans, later to become a perennial contender in the second ASL, made their debut.

The season began on February 29, 1931.  The first half ended on May 31, 1931.  The second half began September 19, 1931, and the season concluded on December 27, 1931.  The season saw strong performances by New Bedford Whalers,  New York Giants and a resurgent Pawtucket Rangers. Hakoah All-Stars improved markedly to take fourth place.  Although the Whalers won this season, they lost the playoff series for the overall 1931 champion, being defeated by Spring 1931 champions New York Giants in a play-off.  Whalers took the first game at home 8-3 before the Giants came back to win 6-0, taking the series on a 9-8 aggregate score.

League standings
 The percentage is a percentage of points won to points available, not a win-lose percentage.

First half

Second half

Playoff

First leg

Second leg

New York Giants won, 9–8, on aggregate.

Top goalscorers

External links
 The Year in American Soccer - 1931
 The Year in American Soccer - 1932

References

American
1931